The Roland JD-800 is a digital synthesizer that was manufactured between 1991 and 1996. It features many knobs and sliders for patch editing and performance control — features that some manufacturers, including Roland, had been omitting in the name of streamlining since the inception of the Yamaha DX7. The JD-800 thus became very popular with musicians who wished to take a hands-on approach to patch programming. The introduction in the manual states that Roland's intention with the JD-800 was to "return to the roots of synthesis".

Technology 
The JD-800 employs Linear Arithmetic synthesis (introduced and made famous by the Roland D-50), which combines sample playback with digital synthesis. The JD-800 has 108 built-in waveforms, which can be expanded via PCM cards. The waveforms span a variety of categories such as analog synthesizers, acoustic instruments, and voices. Many of these waveforms are very short and are used primarily for the attack portion of a sound, while longer ones are used for the sustained part of a sound. The JD-800 was Roland's first instrument to have its core presets developed entirely in the United States, under a short-lived branch of its R&D-LA office in Culver City, California. The core sampled waveforms and factory presets of the JD-800 were created by Eric Persing.

A patch, or single sound, in the JD-800 consists of up to four tones. As every tone consists of an almost completely independent synthesizer voice, a patch could be considered a combination of up to four different synthesizers. In Single mode the JD-800 plays one patch at a time, but in Multi mode it is possible to play five different patches over MIDI, plus a "special" patch. The special patch has different waveforms assigned to the 61 different keys on the keyboard, so is used for drums and percussion sounds. The JD-800 has one effects section. In Single mode, seven effects can be used simultaneously, in series, so all tones in a patch go through the same effects. In Multi mode, three effects can be used at the same time, with all patches sharing the same effects, though any of the patches can be routed to bypass the effects.

Editing and playing
Using the Layer buttons, the four tones of a patch can be switched on and off while playing. When in Edit mode, the Layer buttons are used to choose which tone can be edited using the sliders on the front panel. The Palette sliders allow the player to edit the last active parameter of all four tones individually at the same time. While playing, the Palette sliders can be used like a mixer to set the balance between the four tones in a patch. However, due to the limited accuracy of the sliders, and because edited parameters jump from the value in memory to the value corresponding to the position of the slider, moving the sliders while playing tends to cause sudden jumps in the sound.

The JD-800 manual states: "[T]he original purpose of the synthesizer was to 'create sound'. It's easy to simply select a preset you like, but that sound will always be 'someone else's sound'. We at Roland asked, 'Why don't we return to the roots of synthesis; the enjoyment of creating original sounds?' … 'Creating sounds' may seem like a highly technical process, but it's actually just a matter of moving a slider to make the sound change! This is easy for anyone, and the sounds that you get will always be your very own."

JD-990
Roland released the JD-990 Super JD in 1993. This is an enhanced, rackmount sound module version of the JD-800 with a larger display, and the ability to expand the device with PCM cards for extra sounds.

Expandability 
The JD-800 was expandable by the inclusion of slots for PCM cards (for additional wavesforms), and RAM cards (for additional patches). Roland produced a number of expansion kits consisting of a pair of cards — a PCM card containing new samples, and a RAM card containing a bank of new presets.

PCM add-on cards
Roland later released eight add-on cards for the JD 800:

 SL-JD80-01 Drums & Percussion STANDARD
 SL-JD80-02 Drums & Percussion DANCE
 SL-JD80-03 Rock Drums
 SL-JD80-04 Strings Ensemble
 SL-JD80-05 Brass Section
 SL-JD80-06 Grand Piano
 SL-JD80-07 Guitar Collection
 SL-JD80-08 Accordion

Notable users
 1 Giant Leap
 A Guy Called Gerald
 Armin van Buuren
 Coldcut
 Future Bible Heroes
 Gary Barlow
 Jean-Michel Jarre

 Kevin Moore

 Labrinth
 Laurent Garnier
 Mouse on Mars
Rick Wakeman
 Tom Lord-Alge
 Tony Banks
 Paul Shaffer

References

Further reading

External links
 Vintage Synth Explorer page
 Harmony Central reviews
 JD800Center -Fan page
 JD-800 page at Dancetech
 Retrosound - JD-800 info, demo and pics
 JD-800 Info/pictures/sounds (Flemish/Dutch)
 Convert JD-800 Sysex messages to CC messages
 Polynominal JD800 manual, schematics and audio demos
 GreatSynthesizers JD-800 test report and audio demos

JD-800
Digital synthesizers
Polyphonic synthesizers